Onanì is a comune (municipality) in the Province of Nuoro in the Italian region of Sardinia, located about  north of Cagliari and about  northeast of Nuoro.

The municipality of Onanì contains the frazione (subdivision) Mamone (penal colony).

Onanì borders the following municipalities: Bitti, Lodè, Lula.

Demographic evolution

References

External links

 web.tiscali.it/onani

Cities and towns in Sardinia